Rudresh Mahanthappa (born May 4, 1971) is a New York-based jazz alto saxophonist and composer.

Biography
Mahanthappa is the son of Indian emigrants to the U.S. He was born in Trieste, Italy as a result of his father's job in academia, but spent most of his life in Boulder, Colorado. He graduated from Fairview High School in 1988, subsequently receiving a BM from the Berklee College of Music in 1992 and an MM in jazz composition from Chicago's DePaul University in 1998.

After moving to New York City in 1997, he released the album Architextures with pianist Vijay Iyer. The two would continue to collaborate often, releasing the albums Black Water, Mother Tongue and Codebook with Mahanthappa's quartet, and Raw Materials as a duo.

Manthappa is currently the Anthony P. Lee'79 Director of Jazz at Princeton University, where he teaches improvisation and directs small groups. In 2019, he organized the first annual Princeton University Jazz Festival, which featured headliner Dave Holland along with other student and professional musicians.

Musical influences

During his time at Berklee, he was introduced to the music of Indian saxophonist Kadri Gopalnath, whose use of a Western instrument in carnatic music surprised and inspired Mahanthappa. He would later travel to India on a grant to work with Gopalnath; the two played together in concert between 2005 and 2008 and collaborated on the album Kinsmen (2008), which fuses Western and Indian approaches to improvisation.

In 2010, Mahanthappa recorded and released Apex with saxophonist Bunky Green. As Mahanthappa tells it, "I first heard about Bunky from the late great saxophone teacher Joe Viola when I was a student at Berklee in the early 90s. Joe heard me warming up once and recommended that I check Bunky out as he thought that my approach was on track to being something similar to his. He loaned me Bunky's record Places We've Never Been (Vanguard) which totally knocked me out!" Mahanthappa sought Green out and sent him a tape of his playing to which Green responded by providing some encouraging feedback, leading to a long friendship.

Mahanthappa traveled again to India for his Guggenheim Fellowship so that he could study and gain a better understanding of the formal elements of carnatic music. In a 2011 interview with Westword newspaper about the resulting album, Samdhi, Mahanthappa said, "my idea was to take whatever I learned—take that knowledge—and really put in a setting that has nothing to do with Indian classical music. Mahanthappa further claims The Brecker Brothers, The Yellowjackets, David Sanborn, Grover Washington, Jr., and Miles Davis' electric bands as influences in creating Samdhi.

Groups
He leads or co-leads the Rudresh Mahanthappa Quartet (with Vijay Iyer or Craig Taborn on piano, François Moutin on bass, and Dan Weiss on drums), Raw Materials (with Vijay Iyer), Indo-Pak Coalition (with Rez Abbasi on sitar-guitar and Dan Weiss on tabla), MSG (with Ronan Guilfoyle on bass and Chander Sardjoe on drums), Dakshina Ensemble septet, and various groups playing under the label Dual Identity.

Awards and honors
Since 2003, Mahanthappa has been listed frequently in the Critics' Poll of Down Beat magazine. He was named both "No. 1 Rising Star Jazz Artist" and "No. 1 Rising Star Alto Saxophonist" in the 2010 poll. In 2011, he was voted the No. 1 Alto Saxophonist of the Year by the 59th Annual Down Beat Critics' Poll.

He was given a grant by the New York Foundation for the Arts Fellow in Music (2006), three Rockefeller MAP grants, and two grants from the New York State Council on the Arts.

In 2007, he was named a Guggenheim fellow to pursue his interest in how carnatic music can inform and inspire American jazz.

The Jazz Journalists Association named Mahanthappa Alto Saxophonist of the Year in 2009, 2010, and 2011.

Discography

As leader/co-leader

As sideman

References

External links
 Official website
 
 Saxophone Stylings, With A South-Asian Flair - NPR Fresh Air Interview

1971 births
Living people
Musicians from Colorado
American jazz alto saxophonists
American male saxophonists
Avant-garde jazz musicians
American male musicians of Indian descent
American Hindus
Berklee College of Music alumni
DePaul University alumni
Italian emigrants to the United States
Pi Recordings artists
21st-century American saxophonists
21st-century American male musicians
American male jazz musicians
ACT Music artists
Whirlwind Recordings artists